In statistics, the Fisher transformation (or Fisher z-transformation) of a Pearson correlation coefficient  is its inverse hyperbolic tangent (artanh). 
When the sample correlation coefficient r is near 1 or -1, its distribution is highly skewed, which makes it difficult to estimate confidence intervals and apply tests of significance for the population correlation coefficient ρ. 
The Fisher transformation solves this problem by yielding a variable whose distribution is approximately normally distributed, with a variance that is stable over different values of r.

Definition

Given a set of N bivariate sample pairs (Xi, Yi), i = 1, …, N,  the sample correlation coefficient r is given by

Fisher's z-transformation of r is defined as

where "ln" is the natural logarithm function and "artanh" is the inverse hyperbolic tangent function.

If (X, Y) has a bivariate normal distribution with correlation ρ and the pairs (Xi, Yi) are independent and identically distributed, then z is approximately normally distributed with mean

and standard error

where N is the sample size, and ρ is the true correlation coefficient.

This transformation, and its inverse

can be used to construct a large-sample confidence interval for r using standard normal theory and derivations. See also application to partial correlation.

Derivation

Hotelling gives a concise derivation of the Fisher transformation.

Finding the first term in the large- expansion of the corresponding skewness  results in

Setting  and solving the corresponding differential equation for  yields the inverse hyperbolic tangent  function.

m = 
and
v = 
respectively.

The extra terms are not part of the usual Fisher transformation. The near-constant variance of the transformation is the result of removing its skewness – the actual improvement is achieved by the latter, not by the extra terms. Including the extra terms, i.e., computing (z-m)/v1/2, yields:

which has, to an excellent approximation, a standard normal distribution.

Application 
The application of Fisher's transformation can be enhanced using a software calculator as shown in the figure. Assuming that the r-squared value found is 0.80, that there are 30 data , and accepting a 90% confidence interval, the r-squared value in another random sample from the same population may range from 0.588 to 0.921. When r-squared is outside this range, the population is considered to be different. However, if a certain data set is analysed with two different regression models while the first model yields r-squared = 0.80 and the second r-squared is 0.49, one may conclude that the second model is insignificant as the value 0.49 is below the critical value 0.588.

Discussion 

The Fisher transformation is an approximate variance-stabilizing transformation for r when X and Y follow a bivariate normal distribution.  This means that the variance of z is approximately constant for all values of the population correlation coefficient ρ.  Without the Fisher transformation, the variance of r grows smaller as |ρ| gets closer to 1.  Since the Fisher transformation is approximately the identity function when |r| < 1/2, it is sometimes useful to remember that the variance of r is well approximated by 1/N as long as |ρ| is not too large and N is not too small.  This is related to the fact that the asymptotic variance of r is 1 for bivariate normal data.

The behavior of this transform has been extensively studied since Fisher introduced it in 1915. Fisher himself found the exact distribution of z for data from a bivariate normal distribution in 1921; Gayen in 1951
determined the exact distribution of z for data from a bivariate Type A Edgeworth distribution. Hotelling in 1953 calculated the Taylor series expressions for the moments of z and several related statistics and Hawkins in 1989 discovered the asymptotic distribution of z for data from a distribution with bounded fourth moments.

An alternative to the Fisher transformation is to use the exact confidence distribution density for ρ given by

Other uses

While the Fisher transformation is mainly associated with the Pearson product-moment correlation coefficient for bivariate normal observations, it can also be applied to Spearman's rank correlation coefficient in more general cases. A similar result for the asymptotic distribution applies, but with a minor adjustment factor: see the latter article for details.

See also 
 Data transformation (statistics)
 Meta-analysis (this transformation is used in meta analysis for stabilizing the variance)
 Partial correlation

References

External links
 R implementation

Covariance and correlation
Transforms